The Torneo de la Comunidad de Madrid or Torneo de la CAM (English: Community of Madrid Tournament) was a basketball competition played every preseason between the Spanish ACB teams from the Community of Madrid, until 2014.

Real Madrid is the team with the most tournament titles won, and was the winner of the last ten editions of the tournament. Only Real, Estudiantes, and Fuenlabrada won any of the tournament titles. Collado Villalba and Cajamadrid, also participated at the tournament.

History

Performance by club

See also
Madrid basketball derby

References and notes

External links
Madrid Basketball Federation 

Basketball cup competitions in Spain